Grupo FARO (Foundation for the Advance of Reforms and Opportunities), is an independent, nonprofit and secular think tank. Grupo FARO was founded in Ecuador in 2004.

History
It was established to provide support active participation of civil society, the business sector and state entities, based on research and analysis, for aiming to consolidate an Ecuadorian State that is more efficient and equitable.

in 2009, Grupo FARO was awarded a grant by the Think Tank Initiative -a global programme funded by IDRC, The William and Flora Hewlett Foundation, The Bill and Melinda Gates Foundation, DFID and DGIS.

Its co-funder and current Executive Director is Orazio Bellettini.

In 2012 it was working with Anita Rivas as she tried to handle the impact of extractive industry in her area. A proposal to stop oil drilling in exchange for money was abandoned in 2013 afer the president found that, despite all of the offers of international support, less than 0.5 per cent of the funds required to mitigate lost revenue had arrived in Ecuador.

Strategic approaches 

 Information-based dialogue: Grupo FARO will promote dialogue based on information, through the presentation of evidences for a strict analysis and plural spaces to find solutions on public issues.
 Development of capacities: Grupo FARO  will focus its efforts on developing capacities in actors for transformation of ideas into actions, through training, organization improvement and generation of public-private alliances. 
 Promotion of transparency in the impact of individual and collective actions: Grupo FARO will implement systems to improve transparency and evaluate the impact of public policies and actions, both of public and private actors.

Intervention areas 
 Environment and society
 Public governance
 Equity and social opportunities
 Information society
 Economic growth

Associations and partnerships
Grupo FARO has established a number of national, regional and global partnerships including with: The Overseas Development Institute, the Centro de Políticas Comparadas de Educación (CPCE) at Diego Portales University in Chile, and Ecuador Mi Pais.

See also
Think tanks

References

External links
 Think Tank Initiative
 Grupo FARO

Think tanks based in Ecuador